Eunice Lake may refer to:

 Eunice Lake (Pierce County, Washington)
 Eunice Lake (Nova Scotia)